Cheshmeh Shur or Chashmeh Shur or Cheshmeh-ye Shur may refer to:

Cheshmeh Shur, Qom Iran
Cheshmeh Shur, Razavi Khorasan, Iran